Evgenii Vladimirovich Wulff (Russian Евгений Владимирович Вульф) (1885–1941) was a Russian Empire and Soviet biologist, botanist and plant geographer.

Wulff was born in Crimea and studied at Moscow University 1903-1906. He obtained his PhD in biology from the University of Vienna, Austria, in 1909. He then returned to Crimea and took up a position at the famous Nikitsky Botanical Garden near Yalta. He worked there 1914-1926, undertaking studies of the vegetation and flora of Crimea and founding the multi-volume Flora Taurica. 1921-1926, he also was professor at the Tavrida University of Crimea.

He then moved to the Vavilov All-Union Institute of Crop Plants in Leningrad to expand his scientific studies. He took a particular interest in the history of plant geography. He published a monograph on this topic in 1932, which was translated to English and published in the West posthumously. This book has been hailed as one of the twentieth century's key writings in the evolution of plant geography
. In 1934, he was made professor at the Pokrovsky Pedagogical Institute, where he taught botany parallel to his research at the Vavilov Institute. In 1936, he published his Historical Geography of Plants, of which an expanded version was published posthumously.

Wulff died in 1941 during the Siege of Leningrad - killed by an exploding bomb.

The leguminous shrub Chamaecytisus wulffii was named to his honour by Vitaly Krechetovich in 1945.

References

External links 
 Chrono-Biographical Sketch with portrait photograph

1885 births
1941 deaths
Scientists from Simferopol
People from Simferopolsky Uyezd
Botanists from the Russian Empire
Ecologists from the Russian Empire
Soviet botanists
Soviet ecologists
Academic staff of Tavrida National V.I. Vernadsky University
Imperial Moscow University alumni
Victims of the Siege of Leningrad
Deaths by airstrike during World War II
Academic staff of Herzen University